Lithuania has sent athletes to every World Aquatics Championships since country's national federation, which was founded in 1924 but was closed due Soviet Union, was restored in 1991 and recognized by FINA in 1992.

List of medalists

Participation table

References 

 
Nations at the World Aquatics Championships